Active asteroids are small Solar System bodies that have asteroid-like orbits but show comet-like visual characteristics. That is, they show comae, tails, or other visual evidence of mass-loss (like a comet), but their orbit remains within Jupiter's orbit (like an asteroid). These bodies were originally designated main-belt comets (MBCs) in 2006 by astronomers David Jewitt and Henry Hsieh, but this name implies they are necessarily icy in composition like a comet and that they only exist within the main-belt, whereas the growing population of active asteroids shows that this is not always the case.

The first active asteroid discovered is 7968 Elst–Pizarro. It was discovered (as an asteroid) in 1979 but then was found to have a tail by Eric Elst and Guido Pizarro in 1996 and given the cometary designation 133P/Elst-Pizarro.

Orbits 
Unlike comets, which spend most of their orbit at Jupiter-like or greater distances from the Sun, active asteroids follow orbits within the orbit of Jupiter that are often indistinguishable from the orbits of standard asteroids. Jewitt defines active asteroids as those bodies that, in addition to having visual evidence of mass loss, have an orbit with:
 semi-major axis a < aJupiter (5.20 AU)
 Tisserand parameter with respect to Jupiter TJ > 3.08

Jewitt chooses 3.08 as the Tisserand parameter to separate asteroids and comets instead of 3.0 (the Tisserand parameter of Jupiter itself) to avoid ambiguous cases caused by the real Solar System deviating from an idealized restricted three-body problem.

The first three identified active asteroids all orbit within the outer part of the asteroid belt.

Activity 
 
Some active asteroids display a cometary dust tail only for a part of their orbit near perihelion. This strongly suggests that volatiles at their surfaces are sublimating, driving off the dust. Activity in 133P/Elst–Pizarro is recurrent, having been observed at each of the last three perihelia. The activity persists for a month or several out of each 5-6 year orbit, and is presumably due to ice being uncovered by minor impacts in the last 100 to 1000 years. These impacts are suspected to excavate these subsurface pockets of volatile material helping to expose them to solar radiation.

When discovered in January 2010, P/2010 A2 (LINEAR) was initially given a cometary designation and thought to be showing comet-like sublimation, but P/2010 A2 is now thought to be the remnant of an asteroid-on-asteroid impact. Observations of 596 Scheila indicated that large amounts of dust were kicked up by the impact of another asteroid of approximately 35 meters in diameter.

P/2013 R3

P/2013 R3 (Catalina–PanSTARRS) was discovered independently by two observers by Richard E. Hill using the Catalina Sky Survey's 0.68-m Schmidt telescope and by Bryce T. Bolin using the 1.8-m Pan-STARRS1 telescope on Haleakala. The discovery images taken by Pan-STARRS1 showed the appearance of two distinct sources within 3" of each other combined with a tail enveloping both sources. In October 2013, follow-up observations of P/2013 R3, taken with the 10.4 m Gran Telescopio Canarias on the island of La Palma, showed that this comet was breaking apart. Inspection of the stacked CCD images obtained on October 11 and 12 showed that the main-belt comet presented a central bright condensation that was accompanied on its movement by three more fragments, A,B,C. The brightest A fragment was also detected at the reported position in CCD images obtained at the 1.52 m telescope of the Sierra Nevada Observatory in Granada on October 12.

NASA reported on a series of images taken by the Hubble Space Telescope between October 29, 2013, and January 14, 2014, that show the increasing separation of the four main bodies. The Yarkovsky–O'Keefe–Radzievskii–Paddack effect, caused by sunlight, increased the spin rate until the centrifugal force caused the rubble pile to separate.

Dimorphos

By smashing into the asteroid moon of the binary asteroid 65803 Didymos, NASA's Double Asteroid Redirection Test spacecraft made Dimorphos an active asteroid. Scientists had proposed that some active asteroids are the result of impact events, but no one had ever observed the activation of an asteroid. The DART mission activated Dimorphos under precisely known and carefully observed impact conditions, enabling the detailed study of the formation of an active asteroid for the first time. Observations show that Dimorphos lost approximately 1 million kilograms after the collision. Impact produced a dust plume that temporarily brightened the Didymos system and developed a -long dust tail that persisted for several months. The DART impact is predicted to have caused global resurfacing and deformation of Dimorphos's shape, leaving an impact crater several tens of meters in diameter. The impact has likely sent Dimorphos into a chaotically tumbling rotation that will subject the moon to irregular tidal forces by Didymos before it will eventually return to a tidally locked state within several decades.

Composition 
Some active asteroids show signs that they are icy in composition like a traditional comet, while others are known to be rocky like an asteroid. It has been hypothesized that main-belt comets may have been the source of Earth's water, because the deuterium–hydrogen ratio of Earth's oceans is too low for classical comets to have been the principal source. European scientists have proposed a sample-return mission from a MBC called Caroline to analyse the content of volatiles and collect dust samples.

List 
Identified members of this morphology class (TJup>3.08) include:

Exploration

Castalia is a proposed mission concept for a robotic spacecraft to explore 133P/Elst–Pizarro and make the first in situ measurements of water in the asteroid belt, and thus, help solve the mystery of the origin of Earth's water. The lead is Colin Snodgrass, from The Open University in the UK. Castalia was proposed in 2015 and 2016 to the European Space Agency within the Cosmic Vision programme missions M4 and M5, but it was not selected. The team continues to mature the mission concept and science objectives. Because of the construction time required and orbital dynamics, a launch date of October 2028 was proposed.

On January 6, 2019, the OSIRIS-REx mission first observed episodes of particle ejection from 101955 Bennu shortly after entering orbit around the near-Earth asteroid, leading it to be newly classified as an active asteroid and marking the first time that asteroid activity had been observed up close by a spacecraft. It has since observed at least 10 other such events. The scale of these observed mass loss events is much smaller than those previously observed at other active asteroids by telescopes, indicating that there is a continuum of mass loss event magnitudes at active asteroids.

See also 
Centaur (minor planet) 
Extinct comet

References

External links 
 Proper elements of active asteroids at Asteroid Families Portal
 Henry Hsieh's Main-Belt Comets page has extensive details on Main-belt comets
 David Jewitt. The Active Asteroids
 Planetary Society article on MBCs
 Discussion of possible differences in characteristics of the water in MBCs and other comets
 YouTube Interview with David Jewitt (discussion on main-belt comets starts around 9 minutes into video)
 Impact trigger mechanism diagram by David Jewitt
 Comet-like appearance of (596) Scheila
 Project T3: Finding Comets in the Asteroid Population
 
 
 New Comet: P/2012 T1 (PANSTARRS) (Remanzacco Observatory : 16 Oct 2012)
 
 P/2013 R3: a Main Belt Comet that is breaking apart. J. Licandro New images obtained with the GTC

Asteroids
Comets